Sebastián Báez was the defending champion but chose not to defend his title.

Filip Misolic won the title after defeating Mili Poljičak 6–3, 7–6(8–6) in the final.

Seeds

Draw

Finals

Top half

Bottom half

References

External links
Main draw
Qualifying draw

Zagreb Open - 1
2022 Singles